Arvind Kejriwal (Hindi: [əɾʋin̪d̪ ked͡ʒɾiːʋaːl]; born 16 August 1968) is an Indian politician, former bureaucrat and activist who is serving as the 7th and current Chief Minister of Delhi since 2015. He is also the national convener of the Aam Aadmi Party, which won the 2015 Delhi Assembly elections with a historic majority, obtaining 67 out of 70 seats. He was also the Chief Minister of Delhi from December 2013 to February 2014, stepping down after 49 days of assuming power. He represents New Delhi constituency in Delhi Legislative Assembly since 2015. In 2006, Kejriwal was awarded the Ramon Magsaysay Award for his involvement in the Parivartan movement using right to information legislation in a campaign against government corruption. The same year, after resigning from Government service, he founded the Public Cause Research Foundation to campaign for transparant governance. 

Before joining politics, Kejriwal had worked in the Indian Revenue Service. Kejriwal is a mechanical engineer from Indian Institute of Technology (IIT) Kharagpur. In 2012, he launched the Aam Aadmi Party, which got 28 seats in the 2013 Delhi Legislative Assembly election. Following the election, he assumed office as the Chief Minister of Delhi and resigned 49 days later over inability to mobilise support for his proposed anti-corruption legislation. After the 2015 elections, AAP registered an unprecedented majority. In 2020, he retained power despite the Bharatiya Janata Party's campaigning. His party registered another victory in 2022 Punjab Legislative Assembly election. Kejriwal is the most popular Chief Minister on Twitter and dubbed by media as Prime Minister Narendra Modi's biggest challenger.

Early life and education
Kejriwal was born in an Agrawal family of Baniyas in Siwani in the Bhiwani district of Haryana, India on 16 August 1968, the first of the three children of Gobind Ram Kejriwal and Gita Devi. His father was an electrical engineer who graduated from the Birla Institute of Technology, Mesra. Kejriwal spent most of his childhood in north Indian towns such as Sonipat, Ghaziabad and Hisar. He was educated at Campus School in Hisar and at Holy Child School at Sonipat. In 1985, he took the IIT-JEE exam and scored All India Rank (AIR) of 563. He graduated from Indian Institute of Technology Kharagpur, majoring in mechanical engineering.

He joined Tata Steel in 1989 and was posted in Jamshedpur, Bihar. Kejriwal resigned in 1992, having taken leave of absence to study for the Civil Services Examination. He spent some time in Calcutta (present-day Kolkata), where he met Mother Teresa, and volunteered with The Missionaries of Charity and at the Ramakrishna Mission in North-East India and at Nehru Yuva Kendra.

Career
Arvind Kejriwal joined the Indian Revenue Service (IRS) as an Assistant Commissioner of Income Tax in 1995, after qualifying through the Civil Services Examination. In February 2006, he resigned from his position as Joint Commissioner of Income Tax in New Delhi.

In 2012, he launched the Aam Aadmi Party, which won in the 2013 Delhi Legislative Assembly election. Till date Arvind Kejriwal act as a national convenor of AAP.

Anti-corruption activism

Parivartan and Kabira

In December 1999, while still in service with the Income Tax Department, Kejriwal, Manish Sisodia and others found a movement named Parivartan (which means "change"), in the Sundar Nagar area of Delhi. A month later, in January 2000, Kejriwal took a sabbatical from work to focus on Parivartan.

Parivartan addressed citizens' grievances related to Public Distribution System (PDS), public works, social welfare schemes, income tax and electricity. It was not a registered NGO - it ran on individual donations, and was characterised as a jan andolan ("people's movement") by its members. Later, in 2005, Kejriwal and Manish Sisodia launched Kabir, a registered NGO named after the medieval philosopher Kabir. Like Parivartan, Kabir was also focused on RTI and participatory governance. However, unlike Parivartan, it accepted institutional donations. According to Kejriwal, Kabir was mainly run by Sisodia.

In 2000, Parivartan filed a public interest litigation (PIL) demanding transparency in public dealings of the Income Tax department, and also organised a satyagraha outside the Chief Commissioner's office. Kejriwal and other activists also stationed themselves outside the electricity department, asking visitors not to pay bribes and offered to help them in getting work done for free.

In 2001, the Delhi government enacted a state-level Right To Information (RTI) Act, which allowed the citizens to access government records for a small fee. Parivartan used RTI to help people get their work done in government departments without paying a bribe. In 2002, the group obtained official reports on 68 public works projects in the area, and performed a community-led audit to expose misappropriations worth  7 million in 64 of the projects. On 14 December 2002, Parivartan organized a Jan sunvai (public hearing), in which the citizens held public officials and leaders accountable for the lack of development in their locality.

In 2003 (and again in 2008), Parivartan exposed a PDS scam, in which ration shop dealers were siphoning off subsidized foodgrains in collusion with civic officials. In 2004, Parivartan used RTI applications to access communication between government agencies and the World Bank, regarding a project for privatization of water supply. Kejriwal and other activists questioned the huge expenditure on the project and argued that it would hike water tariffs ten-fold, thus effectively cutting off the water supply to the city's poor. The project was stalled as a result of Parivartan's activism. Another campaign by Parivartan led to a court order that required private schools, which had received public land at discounted prices, to admit more than 700 poor kids without a fee.

Along with other social activists like Anna Hazare, Aruna Roy and Shekhar Singh, Kejriwal came to be recognized as an important contributor to the campaign for a national-level Right to Information Act (enacted in 2005). He resigned from his job in February 2006, and later that year, he was given the Ramon Magsaysay Award for Emergent Leadership, for his involvement with Parivartan. The award recognized him for activating the RTI movement at the grassroots and empowering New Delhi's poor citizens to fight corruption.

By 2012, Parivartan was largely inactive. Sundar Nagri, where the movement was concentrated, suffered from irregular water supply, unreliable PDS system and poorly done public works. Calling it "ephemeral and delusionary in nature", Kejriwal noted that Parivartan's success was limited, and the changes brought by it did not last long.

Public Cause Research Foundation

In December 2006, Kejriwal established the Public Cause Research Foundation in December 2006, together with Manish Sisodia and Abhinandan Sekhri. He donated his Ramon Magsaysay Award prize money as a seed fund. Besides the three founders, Prashant Bhushan and Kiran Bedi served as the Foundation's trustees. This new body paid the employees of Parivartan. Kejriwal used the RTI Act in corruption cases in many government departments including the Income Tax Department, the Municipal Corporation of Delhi, the Public Distribution System and the Delhi Electricity Board.

Jan Lokpal movement

In 2010, Kejriwal protested against corruption in the Commonwealth Games. He argued that the Central Vigilance Commission (CVC) did not have any powers to take any action against the guilty, while CBI was incapable of launching an unbiased investigation against the ministers who controlled it. He advocated appointment of public ombudsman - Lokpal at the Centre and Lokayuktas in states.

In 2011, Kejriwal joined several other activists, including Anna Hazare and Kiran Bedi, to form the India Against Corruption (IAC) group. The IAC demanded enactment of the Jan Lokpal Bill, which would result in a strong ombudsman. The campaign evolved into the 2011 Indian anti-corruption movement. In response to the campaign, the government's advisory body - the National Advisory Council - drafted a Lokpal Bill. However, the NAC's Bill was criticized by Kejriwal and other activists on the grounds that it did not have enough powers to take action against the prime minister, other corrupt officeholders, and the judiciary. The activists also criticized the procedure for the selection of Lokpal, the transparency clauses and the proposal to disallow the Lokpal from taking cognizance of public grievances.

Amid continuing protests, the Government constituted a committee to Draft a Jan Lokpal Bill. Kejriwal was one of the civil society representative members of this committee. However, he alleged that the IAC activists had an unequal position in the committee, and the government appointees kept ignoring their recommendations. The Government argued that the activists could not be allowed to blackmail the elected representatives through protests. Kejriwal retorted that democratically elected representatives could not be allowed to function like dictators, and asked for a public debate on the contentious issues.

The IAC activists intensified their protests, and Anna Hazare organised a hunger strike. Kejriwal and other activists were arrested for defying a police directive to give a written undertaking that they will not go to JP Park. Kejriwal attacked the government on this and said there was a need for a debate over police power to detain and release people at will. In August 2011, a settlement was reached between the Government and the activists.

Besides the government, the Jan Lokpal movement was also criticized by some citizens as 'undemocratic' on the grounds that the ombudsman had powers over elected representatives. Arundhati Roy claimed that the movement was not a people's movement; instead, it was funded by foreigners to influence policymaking in India. She pointed out that the Ford Foundation had funded the Emergent Leadership category of the Ramon Magsaysay Award, and also donated $397,000 to Kejriwal's NGO Kabir. Both Kejriwal and Ford Foundation termed the allegations as baseless, stating that the donations were made to support the RTI campaigns. Besides, several other Indian organizations had also received grants from the Ford Foundation. Kejriwal also denied the allegations that the movement was a plot against the ruling Congress by the RSS, or that it was an upper-caste conspiracy against the Dalits.

By January 2012, the Government had backtracked on its promise to implement a strong Jan Lokpal, resulting in another series of protests from Kejriwal and his fellow activists. These protests attracted lower participation compared to the 2011 protests. By mid-2012, Kejriwal had replaced Anna Hazare as the face of the remaining protestors. In January 2014, Kejriwal said that he will quit from the government if Jan Lokpal Bill is not passed.

In 2015 during the second term of the AAP government in Delhi the Jan Lokpal Bill was passed by the assembly awaiting presidents approval

Establishment of Aam Aadmi Party 

One of the major criticisms directed at the Jan Lokpal activists was that they had no right to dictate terms to the elected representatives. As a result, Kejriwal and other activists decided to enter politics and contest elections. In November 2012, they formally launched the Aam Aadmi Party; Kejriwal was elected as the party's National Convener. The party name reflects the phrase Aam Aadmi, or "common man", whose interests Kejriwal proposed to represent. The establishment of AAP caused a rift between Kejriwal and Hazare.

AAP decided to contest the 2013 Delhi Legislative Assembly election, with Kejriwal contesting against the incumbent Chief Minister Sheila Dikshit. Kejriwal became the fifth most-mentioned Indian politician on social media channels in the run-up to the elections.

During the NDTV Townhall event before the 2022 Gujarat Legislative Assembly election, Arvind Kejriwal said, "The people of Goa have a choice between AAP and BJP. If you want a clean, honest government, you can vote for AAP. The other option is to vote for the BJP directly or indirectly. Indirect voting is when you vote for the Congress, that Congress man will win and go to the BJP." Later on in September 2022, 8 out of 11 Congress MLAs joined BJP.

Chief Minister of Delhi (first term)

In the 2013, Delhi Legislative Assembly elections for all 70 seats, the Bharatiya Janata Party won 31 seats, followed by Aam Aadmi Party with 28 seats. Kejriwal defeated incumbent Chief Minister, Sheila Dikshit of the Indian National Congress (INC), in her constituency of New Delhi by a margin of 25,864 votes.

AAP formed a minority government in the hung assembly, (claiming support for the action gauged from opinion polls) with outside support from the eight INC MLAs, one Janata Dal MLA and one independent MLA. Kejriwal was sworn in as the second-youngest chief minister of Delhi on 28 December 2013, after Chaudhary Brahm Prakash who became chief minister at the age of 34. He was in charge of Delhi's home, power, planning, finance, services and vigilance ministries.

On 14 February 2014, he resigned as Chief Minister after failing to table the Jan Lokpal Bill in the Delhi Assembly. He recommended the dissolution of the Assembly. Kejriwal blamed the Indian National Congress and the Bharatiya Janata Party for stalling the anti-corruption legislation and linked it with the government's decision to register a First Information Report (FIR) against industrialist Mukesh Ambani, chairman and managing director of Reliance Industries. In April 2014 he said that he had made a mistake by resigning without publicly explaining the rationale behind his decision.

2014 General elections

Kejriwal said in January, prior to his resignation as chief minister, that he would not contest a seat in the 2014 Lok Sabha elections. Party members persuaded him to change his mind, and on 25 March, he agreed to contest against the BJP prime ministerial candidate, Narendra Modi, from Varanasi. He lost the contest by a margin of around 3,70,000 votes.

Chief Minister of Delhi (second term)

Kejriwal led Aam Aadmi Party won 67 of the 70 constituencies in the 2015 Delhi Assembly elections, leaving the BJP with three seats and the INC with none. In those elections, he was again elected from the New Delhi constituency, defeating Nupur Sharma by 31,583 votes.  He took oath on 14 February 2015 as Delhi's chief minister for a second time at Ramlila Maidan. Since then his party has passed the Jan Lokpal Bill though with some differences.

There has been a long-running dispute between Kejriwal's office and that of the Lieutenant-Governor of Delhi during Kejriwal's second term as Chief Minister. Various issues have been involved, relating which office has ultimate responsibility for various aspects of government, including some significant public appointments. Manish Sisodia characterised it as "a battle between the selected and the elected" and indicated after a legal setback that the government was prepared to take the issues to the Supreme Court of India.

Mohalla Clinics that are primary health centres in Delhi was first set up by the Aam Aadmi Party government in 2015, and as of 2018, 187 such clinics have been set up across the state and served more than 2 million residents. The Government has kept a target of setting up 1000 such clinics in the city before 2020 Delhi Legislative Assembly Elections. Mohalla Clinics offer a basic package of essential health services including medicines, diagnostics, and consultation free of cost. These clinics serve as the first point of contact for the population, offer timely services, and reduce the load of referrals to secondary and tertiary health facilities in the state. Beginning in October 2019, New Delhi began rolling out free bus transit for women on the Delhi Transport Corporation, with women travelling for free when using pink tickets carrying a message from Kejriwal. He has been criticised for his controversial remarks over Biharis and "outsiders".

Shunglu Committee submitted a report to LG of Delhi raising questions over decisions of Government of Delhi.

Chief Minister of Delhi (third term)

AAP won 62 seats out of 70 in the 2020 Delhi Legislative Assembly election. He took oath on 16 February 2020 as Delhi's chief minister for a  third time at Ramlila Maidan. In May 2021, Kejriwal called for the India central government to immediately stop air travel between India and Singapore, and develop "vaccine alternatives for children", due to "a new variant of coronavirus found in Singapore" which "is being said to be very dangerous for children". However, there is no known Singaporean variant of COVID-19; a recent report discussing the threat of COVID-19 to Singaporean children was discussing a variant of COVID-19 first detected in India: B.1.617. Many of the recent COVID-19 cases in Singapore were of B.1.617. The foreign minister of India, Subrahmanyam Jaishankar, and the foreign minister of Singapore, Vivian Balakrishnan, criticized Kejriwal's comment as "irresponsible" and counter-factual respectively.

Attack by BJP members 

In March 2022, the official residence of CM Kejariwal was attacked by BJP supporters. Deputy CM Shishodia called the incident a conspiracy to murder Kejriwal.

AAP MLA Saurabh Bhardwaj filed a petition in the Delhi High Court (HC) seeking the constitution of a Special Investigation Team (SIT) for investigation in the incident. He petitioned that the attack and vandalization appeared to have been carried out with the "tacit complicity" of Delhi police. The petition said, "On March 30, 2022, several BJP goons, in the garb of a protest, launched an attack on the official residence of the Delhi CM", "Videos and photographs show that these goons casually walked through the security cordon [maintained by Delhi police], kicked and broke the boom barrier, broke the CCTVs cameras with 'lathis', threw paint on the gate of the residence and almost climbed over the gate, while Delhi police personnel simply looked on, doing little to stop the protesters."

The petition called the violence directed towards the CM and his family as "especially egregious" and "meant to subdue, by the use of force, the highest elected official in NCT of Delhi and therefore the elected Government of Delhi. This was a direct attack on democracy."

On 22 August 2017, the Delhi HC had directed the Delhi Police to ensure that no unnecessary protest occurs on the road in front of the Delhi CM's house, as it is a residential area. The petition noted that the inaction of Delhi Police in this incident, was a violation of the 2017 order. The petiton noted, "It thus appears that Delhi Police was hand in glove with the goons as the goons are members of the ruling party in the Central Government, which has absolute control over the Delhi Police through the Ministry of Home Affairs. It is pertinent to note, that in the past as well, on December 10, 2020, there was an attack on the residence of the Deputy Chief Minister by BJP Goons, where also, the Delhi Police did not take any steps to stop the attackers and thereafter failed to take any concrete criminal action against the attackers."

The petition asked the court to issue direction to the Delhi Police and the Union Ministry of Home Affairs for ensuring the security of the Chief Minister and his residence.

On 31 March 2022 eight persons involved in the incident were arrested. A case was filed with the police pertaining to Causing obstruction to a public servant and under The Prevention of Damage to Public Property Act of the Indian Penal Code was lodged.

The Delhi HC noted that the security was not adequate to control the crowd, and sought a status report of the police investigation into the incident.

Electoral performance

Lawsuits
Several defamation cases were filed against Arvind Kejriwal by his political opponents. In January 2014, Kejriwal released a list of most corrupt politicians that included several leaders across the political spectrum. Of the several on the list, Nitin Gadkari immediately filed a defamation suit against Kejriwal. Subsequently, Kejriwal apologised to union minister Nitin Gadkari for his unverified allegations and also sought apology from former minister Kapil Sibal.

In 2016, Kejriwal made allegations against Bikram Majithia, then revenue minister of Punjab of involvement in drug trade for which Majithia filed a defamation case against him and two others from Aam Aadmi party. Kejriwal apologised to Majithia a couple of years later in March 2018.

Kejriwal made allegations against finance minister Arun Jaitley for irregularities in DDCA. Arun Jaitley filed a 10 crore defamation suit against Kejriwal. On 2 March 2016, Delhi High Court asked Chief Minister Arvind Kejriwal and suspended BJP MP Kirti Azad to file their written statements in a civil defamation suit of Rs 5 crores filed by DDCA for their alleged remarks against the cricket body regarding its functioning and finances. Following this in April 2018 Arvind Kejriwal and three others from his party including Sanjay Singh, Raghav Chaddha and Ashutosh apologized Arun Jaitley in a joint letter.

In his affidavit to Election Directorate before the second term elections in 2015 Kejriwal had declared that he has 10 criminal charges and 47 total charges against him.

In 2021, a Delhi court dismissed an assault case filed by a Delhi bureaucrat against Kejriwal and ten AAP MLAs and discharged them of all charges. The court noted that "no prima facie case" was made against them.

Political views
Kejriwal discussed his views on corruption and the state of the Indian democracy in his book Swaraj. He advocates for a decentralisation of government and the involvement of the panchayat in local decisions and budgets. He claims that foreign multinational corporations have too much power in the decision making process of the central government and that the politicians at the centre are not being held accountable for their actions and inaction after their election.

Personal life
In 1995, Arvind married Sunita, a 1993-batch IRS officer. She took voluntary retirement in 2016 as Commissioner of Income Tax in the Income Tax Appellate Tribunal.

The couple have a daughter and a son. Arvind Kejriwal follows Hinduism. Kejriwal is a vegetarian and has been practising the Vipassanā meditation technique for many years.  He is diabetic. In 2016, Kejriwal underwent a surgery for his persistent cough problem.

Kejriwal is an Ambedkarite and calls himself a 'devotee' of B. R. Ambedkar.

Books
 (co-author)

Biographies
 by Pran Kurup

In media
An Insignificant Man, a 2017 Hindi/English Indian socio-political documentary co-produced and directed by Khushboo Ranka and Vinay Shukla and also co-produced by filmmaker Anand Gandhi. The documentary is about the rise of anti-corruption protests in India and the formation and rise to power of the Aam Aadmi Party and Arvind Kejriwal. The filmmakers fought a long battle against censorship in India to get the film released theatrically. The filmmakers eventually won the case against the Indian government. An Insignificant Man was sanctioned for public release without any cuts in a landmark judgement. The film ran in theatres successfully for 8 weeks. Kejriwal himself, however, refused to acknowledge the film or associate with it publicly due to creative differences with the filmmakers.

Kejriwal has appeared on the talk-shows and interviews of News channels. He spoofed himself on the third episode of the first season of The Viral Fever's Barely Speaking With Arnub, where actor Jitendra Kumar cosplayed as Kejriwal while sitting next to him in the later half of the interview. He also appeared in stand-up comedian Kunal Kamra's YouTube interview series Shut Up Ya Kunal.

See also
 Fifth Legislative Assembly of Delhi
 2017 Punjab Legislative Assembly election

References

Notes

Citations

External links
प्रदूषण खत्म करने के लिए केजरीवाल ने लॉन्च किया Green Delhi App (maha khabar)

 Arvind Kejriwal - Profile
 

1968 births
Living people
Ashoka India Fellows
Indian Revenue Service officers
Freedom of information activists
Ramon Magsaysay Award winners
IIT Kharagpur alumni
Indian civil rights activists
Campus School, CCS HAU alumni
Chief Ministers of Delhi
Indian political party founders
Aam Aadmi Party candidates in the 2014 Indian general election
Indian anti-corruption activists
Delhi MLAs 2013–2015
Delhi MLAs 2015–2020
Delhi MLAs 2020–2025
People from Ghaziabad, Uttar Pradesh
Chief ministers from Aam Aadmi Party
Aam Aadmi Party politicians
Kejriwal government
Aam Aadmi Party MLAs from Delhi
Arvind Kejriwal